Mount Clear College, formerly known as Mount Clear Secondary College and Mount Clear Technical High School, is a public high school in Ballarat, Victoria, Australia. It was established after two secondary colleges, Ballarat Boys' Technical School and Ballarat Girls' High School amalgamated in 1981. The college is located in Mount Clear,  from Ballarat's central business district.

History
Ballarat Technical School was founded as a boys' school in 1913, and was officially opened in July 1915 by Sir Alexander Peacock.

In 1976, following the successful amalgamation of the Ballarat Technical School and the Ballarat Girls' High School (est. 1951), Mount Clear Technical High School opened as a school for years 7 to 10 students. Both of those schools had a rich tradition that started in 1874. The Technical school, known as ”Central Tech", was located in Lydiard St South in the CBD and the High School, known as the "Girls School", was located in Barkly Street, Ballarat East.

In 1977 four mini schools were established. One was for students at the Lydiard Street campus. It was known as Lalor Mini School. Students at the old Girls High site were part of the Barkly Mini School. In that year all new year 7 students were based at the Mount Clear campus. Two new mini schools, Canadian and Currawong were also added.

In October 1981, a new building designed around the concept of the mini schools was completed. Students from Lalor Mini School were the first to move into the new building. By the end of that year all students had moved to the new site which was immediately to the east of the Mount Clear Recreation Reserve and just north of the former Mount Clear Railway Station.

In the mid-1980s, in response to school community concerns, year 11 and 12 began to be taught at the school. The names of the mini schools have been retained in the forms of the house names, and on the logo. In 2002 the official name of Mount Clear College was adopted.

Curriculum 
The school focuses on the eight Key Learning Areas: English, Creative and Performing Arts, Health and Physical Education, Languages, Science, Mathematics, Studies of Society & Environment, and Technology. The college offers Japanese or Chinese to students from Year 7 to 12. In the final years students complete VCE, VET or VCAL.

Students in Year 6 can apply for the SEAL Program (Select Entry Accelerated Learning).

Houses 
 Barkly – named for Barkly Street, the former site of Ballarat Girls' School, now a campus of Ballarat Secondary College
 Canadian – named for the Ballarat suburb of Canadian
 Currawong – named for the Currawong, an Australian bird
 Lalor – named for Australian outlaw and politician Peter Lalor

Sport 
MCC is a member of the Ballarat Associated Schools (BAS).

BAS premierships 
MCC has won the following BAS premierships.

Boys:

 Badminton (2) - 2016, 2017

Girls:

 Badminton - 2015
 Basketball - 1977
 Volleyball (2) - 1976, 1977

Alumni
Darren Cheeseman, former Member of the Australian Parliament for the Division of Corangamite
 Jamie McDonald, Australian media personality
 Dan Golding, writer, composer, broadcaster, and academic

See also 
 Education in Ballarat
 List of schools in Ballarat
 List of schools in Victoria, Australia
 List of high schools in Victoria
 Victorian Certificate of Education

External links 
Mount Clear College website

References

Public high schools in Victoria (Australia)
Educational institutions established in 1981
Ballarat Associated Schools
Schools in Ballarat
1981 establishments in Australia